Josette is a feminine given name. It may refer to:

 Josette Abondio (born 1949), Ivorian teacher, writer and playwright
 Josette Amouretti (born 1914), French former tennis player
 Josette Altmann Borbón (born 1958), Costa Rican historian, politician and former First Lady of Costa Rica
 Josette Banzet (born 1938), French actress
 Josette Biyo (born 1958), Filipino educator and former executive director of the Philippine Science High School System
 Josette Bruce (1920–1996), French novelist
 Josette Bynum (born 1977), American former professional wrestler and promoter
 Josette Day (1914–1978), French film actress
 Josette Daydé (1923–1995), French jazz singer, chansonnière and actress
 Josette Durrieu (born 1937), French politician
 Josette Frank (1893–1989), American children's literature expert and educational consultant
 Josette Hébert-Coëffin (1906–1973), French sculptor
 Josette Manin (born 1950), French politician on the island of Martinique
 Josette Pons (born 1947), French politician
 Josette Sheeran (born 1954), American former Executive Director of the World Food Programme and Under Secretary of State for Economic, Business, and Agricultural Affairs
 Josette Simon (born 1960), British actress
 Josette Vidal (born 1993), Venezuelan actress
 nickname of Jacqueline Nearne (1916–1982), British Second World War secret agent

Feminine given names